Christopher R. Blazejewski (born December 3, 1979) is an American politician serving as a member of the Rhode Island House of Representatives representing District 2 since January 2011. He served as deputy whip until 2021 when he was elected majority leader. Blazejewski is a progressive Democrat.

Education
Blazejewski earned his BA from Harvard University and his JD from Harvard Law School.

Elections
2012 Blazejewski was challenged in the September 11, 2012 Democratic Primary, winning with 925 votes (87.6%) and was unopposed for the November 6, 2012 General election, winning with 3,216 votes.
2010 When District 2 incumbent Representative David Segal ran for United States House of Representatives in Rhode Island's 1st congressional district, Blazejewski ran in the September 23, 2010 Democratic Primary, winning with 1,029 votes (71.7%) and won the November 2, 2010 General election with 2,010 votes (70.9%) against Independent candidate Richard Rodi.

References

External links
Official page at the Rhode Island General Assembly
Campaign site

Christopher Blazejewski at Ballotpedia
Christopher R. Blazejewski at the National Institute on Money in State Politics

1979 births
21st-century American politicians
Harvard College alumni
Harvard Law School alumni
Living people
Democratic Party members of the Rhode Island House of Representatives
Place of birth missing (living people)
Politicians from Providence, Rhode Island
Rhode Island lawyers